Thomas Ray Lippert (1950–1999) was a convict and former business law professor at Southwest State College in Marshall, Minnesota. Lippert worked at a fertility clinic named Reproductive Medical Technologies Inc. in Utah from 1988 to the mid 1990s where he reportedly replaced customers' semen with his own. In 1974–1975 he was arrested and later convicted for kidnapping.

See also
 Cecil Jacobson, a fertility doctor who used his own semen to impregnate his patients, without informing them of the source of the semen.

References

External links

Lippert's Children Blog
 

Criminals from Utah
Sperm donation
Sperm donors
Medical malpractice
1950 births
1999 deaths
St. Cloud State University alumni
Notre Dame Law School alumni
American legal scholars